Markus Weissenberger  (born 8 March 1975) is an Austrian former professional footballer who played as a midfielder.

He is a younger brother of former Austria international player Thomas Weissenberger.

Club career
Weissenberger played for Eintracht Frankfurt, TSV 1860 Munich, Arminia Bielefeld, LASK.

In the Eintracht squad he was, in the attacking midfield, often only a backup for Alexander Meier and predominantly gets few short time appearances.

He returned to LASK in summer 2008 on a free transfer.

International career
Weissenberger made his debut for the Austria national team in an August 1999 friendly match against Sweden, coming on as a substitute for Mario Haas. He missed out on Euro 2008, after coming back late from a knee injury.

He earned 29 caps, scoring one goal, until August 2008.

Career statistics

International

Honours
Eintracht Frankfurt
 DFB-Pokal runner-up: 2005–06

References

External links
 Markus Weissenberger at eintracht-archiv.de 
 Profile at VI 
 

1975 births
Living people
People from Bregenz District
Footballers from Vorarlberg
Austrian footballers
Association football midfielders
Austria international footballers
SV Spittal players
LASK players
Arminia Bielefeld players
TSV 1860 Munich players
Eintracht Frankfurt players
Austrian Football Bundesliga players
2. Liga (Austria) players
Bundesliga players
Austrian expatriate footballers
Austrian expatriate sportspeople in Germany
Expatriate footballers in Germany